Therese Bengtsson (born 1979) is a Swedish handball goalkeeper. She played for the club Eslövs IK and for the Swedish national team. She participated at the 2008 Summer Olympics in China, where the Swedish team placed eight.

References

External links

1979 births
Living people
Swedish female handball players
Handball players at the 2008 Summer Olympics
Olympic handball players of Sweden